Robert Duis (14 May 1913 – 25 March 1991) was a German basketball player. He competed in the men's tournament at the 1936 Summer Olympics.

References

1913 births
1991 deaths
German men's basketball players
Olympic basketball players of Germany
Basketball players at the 1936 Summer Olympics
Basketball players from Greater London